Eurídice Moreira da Silva (5 March 1939 – 1 July 2020), better known as Eurídice Moreira or Dona Dida, was a Brazilian Politician and Professor from the state of Alagoas who represented the state of Paraíba.

Career
In 1994, she successfully campaigned for a spot at the Legislative Assembly of Paraíba; her term lasted from 1995 to 1998.

In 1998, she attempted re-election as a State Deputy, but ultimately failed to secure enough votes for a new term.

In 2002, Moreira tried to reclaim her Legislative Assembly of Paraíba seat lost at the previous elections. Once again she wasn't able to secure enough votes in order to be elected.

In 2004, she was elected Mayor of Itabaiana. Her first tenure went from 2005 to 2008.

In 2008, she was re-elected Mayor of Itabaiana. This time she remained in office between 2009 and 2012.

Personal life and death
Moreira was the widow of Aglair Silva, a politician who also held the position of Mayor of Itabaiana. Her son José Sinval, also a politician, is the incumbent Deputy mayor of Itabaiana.

On 1 July 2020, Moreira died in João Pessoa at the age of 81 due to complications brought on by COVID-19 during the COVID-19 pandemic in Brazil.

References

1939 births
2020 deaths
Members of the Legislative Assembly of Paraíba
Democrats (Brazil) politicians
Brazilian Labour Party (current) politicians
People from Maceió
Deaths from the COVID-19 pandemic in Paraíba
Mayors of places in Brazil